Leucostoma is a genus of fungi in the family Valsaceae.

Species
Leucostoma amphibola
Leucostoma auerswaldii
Leucostoma curreyi
Leucostoma excipienda
Leucostoma kunzei
Leucostoma kuduerense
Leucostoma persoonii
Leucostoma mangiferae
Leucostoma massarianum
Leucostoma parapersoonii
Leucostoma persoonii
Leucostoma pseudoniveum
Leucostoma sequoiae
Leucostoma translucens

References

External links

Sordariomycetes genera
Diaporthales